Black Sunshine is a band formed and fronted by extreme sports athlete Matt Reardon and former Loser band guitarist Charles Lee. The band was originally going to release their debut self-titled album on April 13, 2010, but it was delayed to be released on May 25, 2010.

While recuperating from surgeries related to a ski accident, extreme sports athlete Matthew Reardon took time off to recooperate and turned to songwriting. Deciding to form a band to complete the sound of these songs, guitarist John5 introduced Reardon to his previous band-mate from the band Loser, guitarist Charles Lee. Lee, along with bassist Christopher Serafini and drummer Matt 'Toast' Young, came together to complete the band. The band worked with producer Bob Marlette (Filter, Lynyrd Skynyrd) on the album, with him playing instruments on several songs as well.

The album produced one single "Once In My Life", which cracked the Active Rock Top 40, higher than singles from bands such as Nickelback and Atreyu and hit #31 on the Mainstream Rock chart.

The band toured in support of the album with Hinder and My Darkest Days throughout 2010, with their September 8, 2010 concert being streamed online.

Discography
Studio albums
Black Sunshine (2010)

References

External links 
 

American hard rock musical groups
Musical groups established in 2009